Poul Nielsen (17 June 1895 – 12 February 1970) was a Danish footballer. He played in two matches for the Denmark national football team from 1917 to 1921. He was also part of Denmark's squad for the football tournament at the 1920 Summer Olympics, but he did not play in any matches.

References

External links
 

1895 births
1970 deaths
Danish men's footballers
Denmark international footballers
Place of birth missing
Association football forwards
Boldklubben af 1893 players